Roger Gorayeb is a Filipino volleyball coach and former college player. He is noted for being a multi-titled and longtime coach of the San Sebastian College – Recoletos de Manila women's team of the NCAA.

Career
Gorayeb has served as head coach of the San Sebastian College women's volleyball team. Under Gorayeb's watch, San Sebastian grabbed 11 consecutive championships for the women's team from 1986 to 1997, 22 women's volleyball titles, 6 titles in women's beach volleyball and 11 in junior's volleyball. Gorayeb started his coaching career as a player-coach in 1984, when he was tasked to lead San Sebastian's men's team when their Australian coach left the team.

He was also the head coach of the Ateneo Lady Eagles volleyball team for five years until his resignation in 2013 as head coach to focus on his coaching stint with San Sebastian.

From January 2015 to April 2017, he was the head coach of the NU Lady Bulldogs volleyball team.

He previously served as head coach of the Philippine women's national team in 2013 for the 2014 FIVB Women's World Championship qualifiers and has also led the women's team of the PLDT Home Telpad Turbo Boosters at the Shakey's V-League in 2014.

Gorayeb's left PLDT Home Fibr after his contract expired by the end of 2021. This marks the end of Gorayeb's eight years stint of coaching PLDT-backed teams.

Controversies
Gorayeb and volleyball referee Rodrigo Rojas were given a one-game suspension by the NCAA on December 15, 2015, after they involved in a "shouting" and "shoving" incident during the game between the Gorayeb-coached San Sebastian Stags and the defending NCAA women's volleyball champions Arellano Chiefs last December 12.

He was also involved in a brawl with several players of Perpetual Help Altas basketball team and its coach Frankie Lim during a volleyball game in 2011 held at the San Beda Gym.

Personal life
In 2019, Gorayeb was diagnosed with multiple myeloma. By June 2020, he was already cancer-free.

References

Filipino volleyball coaches
Volleyball coaches of international teams
1960s births
Living people
People with multiple myeloma